Eleanor Bezzina (born 25 March 1977) is a Maltese sports shooter. She competed in the women's 10 metre air pistol event at the 2016 Summer Olympics. She competed at the 2020 Summer Olympics, in Women's 10 m air pistol and Women's 25 m pistol.

She also competed at the 2010 Commonwealth Games, 2018 Commonwealth Games, 2014 World Championships, 2018 World Championships, and 2021 European Championships.

References

External links
 

1977 births
Living people
Maltese female sport shooters
Olympic shooters of Malta
Shooters at the 2016 Summer Olympics
Competitors at the 2018 Mediterranean Games
Shooters at the 2018 Commonwealth Games
Commonwealth Games competitors for Malta
Place of birth missing (living people)
European Games competitors for Malta
Shooters at the 2015 European Games
Shooters at the 2019 European Games
Mediterranean Games competitors for Malta
Shooters at the 2020 Summer Olympics